Susanne Schuster (born 9 May 1963, in Bietigheim) is a German former swimmer who competed in the 1984 Summer Olympics.

References

1963 births
Living people
German female swimmers
German female freestyle swimmers
Olympic swimmers of West Germany
Swimmers at the 1984 Summer Olympics
Olympic bronze medalists for West Germany
Olympic bronze medalists in swimming
European Aquatics Championships medalists in swimming
Medalists at the 1984 Summer Olympics